"You Still Want Me" is a single by the Kinks released in 1964. It was their second record, and (like its predecessor) failed to chart upon release, threatening the band's deal with Pye Records. However, the massive success of the band's next single, "You Really Got Me", ensured their tenure with Pye would continue until 1971, when they shifted to RCA.



"You Do Something to Me" 
The B-side "You Do Something to Me" was one of the first five songs the Kinks ever recorded, before sessions for their first album had begun in earnest. The song has been described as "proto-punk". It was later released on an album with the 1998 reissue of Kinks.

Personnel
According to band researcher Doug Hinman:

The Kinks
Ray Davies lead vocal, rhythm guitar
Dave Davies backing vocal, lead guitar
Pete Quaife backing vocal, bass

Additional musician
Bobby Graham drums

References

Sources

 

The Kinks songs
1964 singles
Song recordings produced by Shel Talmy
Songs written by Ray Davies
Pye Records singles
1964 songs